Nos Galan is an annual five-kilometre (3.1 mi) road running event, held on New Year's Eve in Mountain Ash, in the Cynon Valley of South Wales.

History
Nos Galan celebrates the life and achievements of Welsh runner Guto Nyth Brân. Founded in 1958 by local runner Bernard Baldwin, it is run over the  route of Bran's first competitive race.

At its height covered by the BBC nationally as part of its New Year's Eve celebrations, the races were halted in 1973 due to concerns expressed by the Glamorgan Police regarding the undue delay to traffic. Nos Galan was resurrected in 1984, when a reduced field of 14 runners ran a  race. The race also broke with tradition, with three mystery runners, representing the present, past and future of athletics, carried the Nos Galan Torch.

Nos Galan still attracts runners from all over Great Britain. The 2009 race attracted over 800 runners, and 10,000 people into Mountain Ash for the associated entertainment.

A virtual race was held in 2020.

Route and traditions
The main race starts with a church service at Llanwynno, and then a wreath is laid on the grave of Guto Nyth Brân in Llanwynno graveyard. After lighting a torch, it is carried to the nearby town of Mountain Ash, where the main race takes place. The format of the race has changed several times over its history. The current race consists of three circuits of the town centre, starting in Henry Street and ending in Oxford Street, by the commemorative statue of Guto.

Traditionally, the race was timed to end at midnight. But in recent times it was rescheduled for the convenience of family entertainment, now concluding at around 21:00.

Rescheduling has resulted in a regrowth in size and scale, and now starts with an afternoon of street entertainment, and fun run races for children, concluding with the church service, elite runners race and presentations.

Mystery runner
The race is started and run by a mystery runner, normally a running or local sporting celebrity. The mystery runner lays the wreath:
1958 – Tom Richards
1959 – Ken Norris
1960 – Derek Ibbotson
1961 – John Merriman
1962 – Martin Hyman
1963 – Bruce Tulloh
1964 – Stan Eldon
1965 – Ann Packer
1966 – Mary Rand
1967 – Ron Jones
1968 – Lyn Davies
1969 – Lillian Board
1970 – John Whetton
1971 – David Bedford
1972 – David Hemery
1973 – Berwyn Price
1984 – Steve Jones, David Bedford, Lisa Hopkins
1985 – No Race
1986 – Kirsty Wade
1987 – Tony Simmons
1988 – Tim Hutchings
1989 – Bernie Plain
1990 – Phillip Snoddy
1991 – Dennis Fowles
1992 – Guto Eames, Tremayne Rutherford
1993 – Simon Mugglestone
1994 – Steve Robinson
1995 – Neil Jenkins
1996 – Robbie Regan
1997 – Iwan Thomas
1998 – Jamie Baulch, Ron Jones
1999 – Garin Jenkins, Dai Young
2000 – Christian Malcolm
2001 – Darren Campbell
2002 – Matt Elias
2003 – Stephen Jones
2004 – Nicole Cooke
2005 – Gethin Jenkins, Martyn Williams, T. Rhys Thomas
2006 – Rhys Williams
2007 – Kevin Morgan
2008 – Linford Christie
2009 – James Hook, Jamie Roberts
2010 – John Hartson, Mark Taylor
2011 – Shane Williams, Ian Evans
2012 – Dai Greene, Samantha Bowen
2013 – Alun Wyn Jones
2014 – Adam Jones
2015 – Colin Jackson
2016 – Chris Coleman
2017 – Nathan Cleverly and Colin Charvis
2018 – David Bedford, Sam Warburton and Rhys Jones
2019 – Nigel Owens
2020 – VIRTUAL RACE

References

External links
  (Rhondda Cynon Taf authority website)

Athletics competitions in Wales
Sport in Rhondda Cynon Taf
Road running in the United Kingdom
5K runs
Recurring sporting events established in 1958
1958 establishments in Wales
Winter events in Wales
Mountain Ash, Rhondda Cynon Taf